Aurensan is the name of the following communes in France:

 Aurensan, Gers, in the Gers department
 Aurensan, Hautes-Pyrénées, in the Hautes-Pyrénées department